Mason is a small unincorporated rural community in Okfuskee County, Oklahoma, United States. The post office was established October 17, 1910. It was named for the first postmaster, Daniel S. Mason.

Unincorporated communities in Okfuskee County, Oklahoma
Unincorporated communities in Oklahoma